"Yes Sir, I Can Boogie" is a 1977 hit single by the Spanish vocal duo Baccara. Written by Frank Dostal and Rolf Soja, and produced by Soja, this song was a hit across Europe and became the duo's sole number one single in the United Kingdom, spending a single week at the top of the UK Singles Chart in October 1977.

Baccara were Spanish flamenco dancers Mayte Mateos and Maria Mendiola.  They were discovered on the island of Fuerteventura in the Canary Islands by RCA Records executive Leon Deane, who saw them dancing flamenco and singing traditional songs for tourists and signed them to the label.

Other uses
 In 2014, the song was used in a television advertisement in the United Kingdom for Cadbury Dairy Milk.
 The song was adopted by fans of the Scotland national football team in 2020 following the team's qualification for the UEFA Euro 2020 championships. It had first become notable locally in 2015, due to a stag party video of Aberdeen defender Andrew Considine miming to the song while dressed in drag. Five years later, after Scotland defeated Serbia to reach their first major tournament since 1998, videos of the players (including Considine) chanting the song in celebration after the match went viral on social media. Following the renewed success of the song, one half of Baccara, Maria Mendiola, said that she would be happy to re-record the song for the people of Scotland. Following renewed popularity, the song re-entered the UK charts on 20 November 2020 at number 57. In June 2021, Scottish DJ George 'GBX' Bowie released a new remixed version of the song for Scottish fans to use as an anthem for UEFA Euro 2020. This dance version included new vocals from Baccara and charted on the Official Singles Sales Chart Top 100, peaking at number 11.
 Glaswegian band the Fratellis performed a live version of "Yes Sir, I Can Boogie" for their appearance on The Chris Evans Breakfast Show on 26 March 2021. The positive response to their version prompted the band to release a recording of their performance of the song as part of the Charity Boogie Bundle, a special edition digital download of their then-latest album Half Drunk Under a Full Moon, with all profits going to the Tartan Army Children's Charity, Soccer Aid and the Eilidh Brown Memorial Fund. The band also announced plans to record a studio version of their cover with new lyrics, which is to be released ahead of the Scotland national football team's opening game at Euro 2020 against the Czech Republic on 14 June 2021. While Mary Dostal and Marie-Luise Soja, widows of the song's writers Frank Dostal and Rolf Soja respectively, endorsed the Fratellis' version of the song and asserted that their late husbands would have also approved, Baccara vocalist Maria Mendiola was less keen on it, stating that she felt that they made the song sound more like the James Last Orchestra instead of disco. Having said that, Mendiola still considered the Fratellis "fantastic" and would be happy for their version of the song to be successful.
 In 2022, clothing chain store H&M used the song in an advertisement.

Track listings
7" single (Europe & US)
 "Yes Sir, I Can Boogie" – 4:28
 "Cara Mia" – 2:53
12" maxi single (US only)
 "Yes Sir, I Can Boogie" – 6:50
 "Yes Sir, I Can Boogie" – 6:50

Charts

Weekly charts

Year-end charts

Certifications and sales

See also
List of best-selling singles
List of best-selling singles by country

References

UK Singles Chart number-one singles
European Hot 100 Singles number-one singles
Number-one singles in Germany
Number-one singles in Sweden
Number-one singles in Switzerland
Number-one singles in Norway
1977 debut singles
Songs written by Frank Dostal
1977 songs
RCA Records singles
Songs about dancing
Irish Singles Chart number-one singles
Disco songs
Sophie Ellis-Bextor songs
Scotland national football team songs
2020 singles